Armenian American Political Action Committee (A.A.P.A.C.), was founded by Albert A. Boyajian.

It is a grassroots political organization and coordinates with a network of offices, chapters and supporters throughout the United States and affiliated organizations around the world, and concerns of the Armenian-American community on a broad range of issues.

See also
Armenian American lobby
Armenian National Committee of America
Armenian Assembly of America
Armenian Youth Federation
Armenian Diaspora
List of Armenian-Americans
Little Armenia, Los Angeles, California

External links
Armenian American Political Action Committee Official Site

References

Armenia–United States relations
Political advocacy groups in the United States
Armenian-American history
Armenian diaspora